Mount Henderson may refer to one of several various mountains, including:

in Antarctica:

 Mount Henderson (White Island)
 Mount Henderson (Britannia Range)
 Mount Henderson (Holme Bay)

elsewhere:

 Mount Henderson (Washington), in the Olympic Mountains